The 1958 Paris–Tours was the 52nd edition of the Paris–Tours cycle race and was held on 5 October 1958. The race started in Paris and finished in Tours. The race was won by Gilbert Desmet.

General classification

References

1958 in French sport
1958
1958 Challenge Desgrange-Colombo
1958 in road cycling
October 1958 sports events in Europe